Ames Department Stores Inc. was an American chain of discount stores based in Rocky Hill, Connecticut, United States. The company was founded in 1958 with a store in Southbridge, Massachusetts, and at its peak operated 700 stores in 20 states, including the Northeast, Upper South, Midwest, and the District of Columbia, making it the fourth-largest discount retailer in the country.

Despite some success in its later years, Ames was plagued by debt "via acquisition decisions" and a slow decline in sales in the new global market and suburban developments. This resulted in two bankruptcy filings that ultimately put an end to the chain. The company, despite expanding into other markets and taking over many closed stores abandoned by competitors, went out of business in 2002.
All stores ceased operations on October 19, 2002.

History

Ames began in 1958 when three Connecticut brothers, Milton, Irving, and Herbert Gilman, joined with their partner Philip Feltman, opened their first store in the Ames Worsted Textile Co. mill in Southbridge. The Gilmans and Feltman simply used the old sign of the textile mill for the new business. In 1971, this store was replaced with a modern store in Sturbridge, Massachusetts. A second store opened in October 1959 in St. Johnsbury, Vermont.

Ames' original business strategy brought discounting to the smaller towns and rural areas of the Northeast. The company's success in serving a largely rural customer base in smaller, less-competitive markets resulted in consistently strong financial performance and steady growth combining acquisitions and an aggressive store-building program through the late 1980s.

Many of the first stores were converted industrial sites, such as the first store in a former textile mill. Ames exploited the availability of cheap real estate in this manner in the first decades of the company, later moving to custom-built store facilities that provided standardized planning and marketing.

Ames' stock was added to the American Stock Exchange in May 1967. The company later started trading on the NYSE in November 1972.

Wave of expansion and first bankruptcy
Ames acquired the 32-store "Big N" chain from Neisner Brothers in November 1978. In 1984 Ames acquired the King's Department Stores chain and added most of its 193 stores to the fold. In 1985 Ames acquired G.C. Murphy of McKeesport, Pennsylvania, a chain that operated both discount stores and variety stores (the variety stores and many of the smaller G.C. Murphy discount stores would eventually be sold by Ames to McCrory Stores in 1989). Three years after the acquisition of G.C. Murphy, Ames expanded further, acquiring the 392-store Zayre chain in 1988. Saddled with increased debt and hampered by the additional cost of converting those stores to Ames stores, the company suffered a significant reduction in profitability in late 1989 and early 1990. The Zayre chain also operated with stores concentrated in two distinct regions, the Northeast and Florida, which made coordination difficult.

In April 1990, Ames filed for bankruptcy protection under Chapter 11 of the U.S. Bankruptcy Code. One of the causes of the bankruptcy appeared to be Ames' policy of extending consumer credit to almost anyone who asked, without first checking their credit rating, in an attempt to increase Ames' market share. Ames had also replaced the Zayre credit card program with Visa cards that could be used anywhere Visa was accepted. This often resulted in Ames giving credit cards to customers who were already in debt, and they tended to attract high risk borrowers who tended to default on their debt payments. During their bankruptcy, Ames closed 370 land-based stores, the highest building properties in rural regions of the Northeast. It was also during this time that Ames changed its logo, trading in its traditional red and white colors for the green color present in Zayre stores; this eventually became an identifying mark of most Ames stores.

Emergence from bankruptcy and acquisition of Hills
After successfully emerging from bankruptcy on December 30, 1992, the company returned to profitability in 1993 and improved its operating performance. Net income increased to $17.3 million for 1996 (equivalent to $ in ) (fiscal year ended January 25, 1997), compared with a net loss of $1.6 million for fiscal 1995 (equivalent to $ in ). Income before other charges and gains for the fiscal 1996 year was $33.3 million (equivalent to $ in ), compared with $6.9 million in the prior fiscal year (equivalent to $ in ), a $26.4 million (equivalent to $ in ) improvement. During the 1990s, Ames was also known for moving into many former locations of its competitors. The chain added several Bradlees stores that closed in the early part of the decade and opened 12 new stores in 1996, 11 of which were former Jamesway stores when that chain went out of business in late 1995. Ames also took over several Caldor locations after its liquidation in 1999, as well as a few Montgomery Ward stores when that chain closed later that year.

With the acquisition of Hills Department Stores in 1998, Ames became the nation's fourth-largest discount retail chain behind Walmart, Kmart, and Target. Although Hills was headquartered in suburban Boston, its stores were concentrated in Indiana, Kentucky, Ohio, Pennsylvania, and western New York, which was a regional complement to Ames stores in the northeast. Then, Ames had just over 600 stores, mostly in the Northeast and Midwest, employing about 22,000.

Expansion into Chicago
In 1986, Ames moved into the Chicago area by acquiring Zayre, and later in 2000 by acquiring all but one of the seven Goldblatt's department stores. Other locations included former Venture and Builders Square stores, making for a total of 11 stores. The company hoped to target the low-income and ethnic consumer, using techniques that were proven successful. "The stores are generally on the South Side of Chicago, which has a low income base," a Ladenburg Thalmann analyst Beder said. Before the opening day, a television marketing campaign showed cheery Ames employees working while singing "My Kind of Town," a song that strongly referred to Chicago. Billboards read, "Our Kind of Town, Your Kind of Discount Store". On September 21, 2000, Ames opened eight of its Chicago stores and opened the others shortly thereafter. A few months later, Ames opened a few additional stores.

1999–2002: Second bankruptcy and demise

In March 1999, Ames closed 8 stores. In November 2000, Ames closed 32 stores, 31 of which were the newly acquired Hills. Some of these closings had been anticipated, as these were considered the weakest of the Hills chain. On August 20, 2001, Ames closed another 47 stores. The company filed for bankruptcy protection for the second time. In November 2001, Ames closed 16 more stores and a distribution center. In December 2001, Ames closed 54 additional stores. Ames closed another six stores in June 2002, leaving the chain with 327 stores, about half of what it had in 1998.

On August 14, 2002, Ames' executives announced they would close the remaining 327 stores in the chain and wind-down business, converting the Chapter 11 bankruptcy reorganization to a Chapter 7 bankruptcy liquidation. "Continued softness in sales, combined with tightening terms and slower shipments from our suppliers, have reduced our funds availability below critical levels," Ames' chairman and CEO Joseph R. Ettore, who had presided over the bankruptcy and liquidation of Stuart's and Jamesway prior to joining Ames, said about Ames' decision to go out of business. Analysts generally believe that debt related to the acquisition of Hills Department Stores, at the same time as the tightened credit markets of 2001, caused the bankruptcy. The increasing penetration of Walmart into the Northeast also made Ames' fate inevitable. In the Pittsburgh area, Target was already planning and had started an expansion into that area just as Ames was struggling, capitalizing on Ames' problems. After the emergence from the first Chapter 11, buying the Hills department stores essentially became its demise. Having made barely enough to make a profit, purchasing the Hills stores put the company's debt-to-income ratio at an all-time high. With no other options, and creditors pulling out of contracts due to failure to pay, corporate made the decision to file for a second, and final bankruptcy.

Private investment company Oak Point  Partners acquired the residual assets from the Ames Department Stores, Inc., et al., Bankruptcy Estates on December 18, 2012.

Alleged revival
In December 2022, Molyneux Group, who owns the assets of Bradlees Department Stores PLC, announced that Ames Department Stores would be returning after 21 years, with new locations opening in “Spring 2023”. The company posted a new website announcing as such on amesstores.com, the domain which the chain used from 1996 until its bankruptcy in 2002. The same month, reporters from WJAR and WVIT investigated the claims of the store's revival, with both reporters noting that they were unable to make contact with anyone involved with Molyneux Group.
The project is allegedly led by Molyneux Group's American division, Silver Knight Group. There is no evidence of Molyneux or Silver Knight Group being legitimate companies. As of mid-March, 2023, amesstores.com no longer displays any messaging.

References

External links
The Ames Fan Club – Photos, Resources, Store Locator

1958 establishments in Massachusetts
2002 disestablishments in Connecticut
Retail companies disestablished in 2002
Companies that filed for Chapter 11 bankruptcy in 1990
Companies that filed for Chapter 11 bankruptcy in 2001
Defunct companies based in Connecticut
Defunct department stores based in Connecticut
Defunct discount stores of the United States
Economy of the Eastern United States
American companies established in 1958
Retail companies established in 1958
Rocky Hill, Connecticut
Companies that have filed for Chapter 7 bankruptcy